During World War II, the United States Army Air Forces fought the Empire of Japan in the Central Pacific Area. As defined by the War Department, this consisted of most of the Pacific Ocean and its islands, excluding the Philippines, Australia, the Netherlands East Indies, the Territory of New Guinea (including the Bismarck Archipelago) the Solomon Islands and areas to the south and east of the Solomons.

The initial USAAF combat organization in the region was Seventh Air Force, which was originally formed in Hawaii as the Army Air defense command for the islands. After the Pearl Harbor Attack on 7 December 1941, Seventh Air Force retained the mission of its predecessor of the defense of the Hawaiian Islands and until the closing months of the war it maintained its headquarters at Hickam Field. The command however, deployed most of its combat units to the Central Pacific.

As the war progressed, some Seventh Air Force units moved into the South West Pacific theatre and coordinated their activities with Fifth and Thirteenth Air Force units in New Guinea, Netherlands East Indies and Philippines during 1944 and 1945.

In 1944, Twentieth Air Force was reassigned from the China Burma India Theater to bases in the Marianas chain of islands, consisting primarily of Saipan, Tinian, and Guam. The Marianas airfields were considered as being ideal bases from which to launch B-29 Superfortress operations against Japan. The islands were about 1500 miles from Tokyo, a range which the B-29s could just about manage. Most important of all, they could be put on a direct supply line from western United States ports by ship.

In September 1945, just after the Surrender of Japan, a few advance elements of Eighth Air Force arrived on Tinian and Guam. Eighth Air Force was transferred from England to be a second strategic air force in the Pacific War, with a mission to carry out B-29 attacks on the Japanese Home Islands during the planned Invasion of Japan beginning in November 1945. These advance units were reassigned to other stations in December 1945.

Seventh Air Force operations focused on supporting Army and Naval forces in the tactical campaigns against Japanese forces in the Central Pacific, while Twentieth Air Force performed strategic bombing missions directly against the Japanese home islands.

Airfields and unit assignments

BAKER ISLAND

 Baker Island Airfield, Baker Island
 
 45th Fighter Squadron, 15th Fighter Group, 1 September-27 November 1943

CAROLINE ISLANDS

 Angaur Airfield, Angaur, Palau Islands, Caroline Islands
 
 Seventh Air Force
 22d Bombardment Group, Heavy, 26 November 1944 – 20 January 1945
 2d Bombardment Squadron, Heavy, 28 November 1944 – 19 January 1945
 19th Bombardment Squadron, Heavy, 2 December 1944 – 26 January 1945
 33d Bombardment Squadron, Heavy, 26 November 1944 – 20 January 1945
 408th Bombardment Squadron, Heavy, 1 December 1944 – 13 January 1945
 494th Bombardment Group, Heavy, 30 September 1944 – 23 June 1945
 864th Bombardment Squadron, Heavy, 30 September 1944 – 23 June 1945
 865th Bombardment Squadron, Heavy, 30 September 1944 – 23 June 1945
 866th Bombardment Squadron, Heavy, 30 September 1944 – 23 June 1945
 867th Bombardment Squadron, Heavy, 30 September 1944 – 23 June 1945

 Peleliu Airfield, Peleliu, Palau Islands, Caroline Islands
 
 Seventh Air Force
 28th Photographic Reconnaissance Squadron, Detachment, VII Fighter Command, 5 October 1944 – April 1945

GILBERT ISLANDS

 Abemama Airfield, Abamama Atoll, Gilbert Islands
 
 Seventh Air Force
 30th Bombardment Group, Heavy 4 January–19 March 1944
 27th Bombardment Squadron, Heavy, operated from Abemama 26 February-14 March 1944
 392d Bombardment Squadron, Heavy, 10 January-16 March 1944
 9th Troop Carrier Squadron, Seventh Air Force, 27 March–3 August 1944
 47th Bombardment Squadron (Medium), 41st Bombardment Group (Medium), 22 December 1943 – 20 April 1944
 48th Bombardment Squadron (Medium), 41st Bombardment Group (Medium), 22 December 1943 – 23 April 1944

 Bonriki Airfield (Mullinix Field). Bonriki Island, Tarawa Atoll, Gilbert Islands
 
 Seventh Air Force
 Headquarters, VII Bomber Command, January–March 1944
 11th Bombardment Group (Heavy), 28 January–4 April 1944
 26th Bombardment Squadron (Heavy), 25 January-13 April 1944
 98th Bombardment Squadron (Heavy), 20 January-2 April 1944
 431st Bombardment Squadron (Heavy), 16 January-30 March 1944
 41st Bombardment Group (Medium), 17 December 1943 – 23 April 1944
 396th Bombardment Squadron (Medium), 28 January-19 April 1944
 820th Bombardment Squadron (Medium), 24 December 1943 – 26 April 1944

 Makin Airfield, Butaritari Island, Makin Atoll, Gilbert Islands
 
 Seventh Air Force
 41st Bombardment Group (Medium), 24 April-13 October 1944
 47th Bombardment Squadron (Medium), 41st Bombardment Group (Medium), 21 April-4 November 1944
 48th Bombardment Squadron (Medium), 41st Bombardment Group (Medium), 24 April-13 October 1944 (operated from Saipan 23 July-21 August 1944)
 396th Bombardment Squadron (Medium), 41st Bombardment Group (Medium), 24 December 1943 – 19 April 1944
 820th Bombardment Squadron (Medium), 27 April-13 October 1944
 38th Bombardment Squadron, Heavy, 30th Bombardment Group, Heavy,(operated from Makin Atoll 26 February-22 March 1944)
 531st Fighter Bomber Squadron, Seventh Air Force, 18 December 1943 – 17 February 1944
 531st Fighter Squadron, Seventh Air Force, 18 February–March 1944

 Hawkins Field (Tarawa), Betio Island, Tarawa Atoll, Gilbert Islands
 
 Seventh Air Force
 Headquarters, VII Bomber Command, January 1944
 11th Bombardment Group (Heavy), 14–27 January 1944

HAWAIIAN ISLANDS

HAWAII ISLAND
 Seventh Air Force
 General Lyman Field, Hawaii, Hawaiian Islands
 
 45th Fighter Squadron, 15th Fighter Group, 20 October-19 December 1942
 46th Fighter Squadron, 15th Fighter Group, 16 December 1942 – 19 March 1943
 72d Fighter Squadron, 15th Fighter Group, 25 July-21 October 1943
 86th Observation Squadron, 7th Air Force, June-17 August 1942
 333d Fighter Squadron, 318th Fighter Group, 6 April-27 July 1943

KAUAI ISLAND
 Seventh Air Force
 Barking Sands Field, Kauai, Hawaiian Islands
 
 494th Bombardment Group (Heavy), 15 June-29 September 1944
 864th Bombardment Squadron (Heavy), 15 June-29 September 1944
 865th Bombardment Squadron (Heavy), 15 June-29 September 1944
 866th Bombardment Squadron (Heavy), 15 June-29 September 1944
 867th Bombardment Squadron (Heavy), 15 June-29 September 1944
 47th Fighter Squadron, 15th Fighter Group, 29 July-7 November 1942
 78th Fighter Squadron, 15th Fighter Group, 23 April-30 July 1943
 392d Bombardment Squadron (Heavy), 30th Bombardment Group (Heavy), 20 October-9 November 1943
 819th Bombardment Squadron (Heavy), 30th Bombardment Group (Heavy), 22 October-11 November 1943

MOLOKAI ISLAND
 Seventh Air Force
 Homestead Field, Molokai, Hawaiian Islands
 

OAHU ISLAND
 Bellows Field, Oahu, Hawaiian Islands
 
 318th Fighter Group, 9 February 1943-Jun 1944
 19th Fighter Squadron, 18 April-19 June 1944
 44th Fighter Squadron, 15–23 October 1942
 19th Pursuit Squadron (Interceptor), 18th Pursuit Group (Interceptor), 20 February-14 May 1942
 19th Fighter Squadron, 18th Fighter Group 15–21 May 1942 and 20 October 1942 – 8 February 1943
 26th Bombardment Squadron (Heavy), 11th Bombardment Group (Heavy), 8 April-10 May 1943
 44th Pursuit Squadron (Interceptor), 18th Pursuit Group (Interceptor), 7 November-11 December 1941
 44th Fighter Squadron, 18th Fighter Group, 23 June-14 October 1942
 45th Fighter Squadron, 15th Fighter Group, 14–31 August 1943 and 19 June 1944 – 5 February 1945
 47th Pursuit Squadron (Fighter), 15th Pursuit Group (Fighter), 22 February-24 March 1942
 47th Fighter Squadron, 15th Fighter Group, 8 June 1944 – 27 January 1945
 58th Bombardment Squadron, (Light), Hawaiian Air Force, 18 March-29 April 1941 and 11–18 December 1941
 72d Bombardment Squadron (Heavy), 5th Bombardment Group (Heavy), 11 December 1941 – 18 September 1942
 73d Fighter Squadron, 318th Fighter Group, 22 May-16 June 1942 and 8 November 1943 – 22 June 1944
 78th Fighter Squadron, 15th Fighter Group, 8 June 1944 – 24 January 1945
 86th Observation Squadron, Hawaiian Air Force, 15 March 1941 – 2 February 1942
 86th Observation Squadron, 7th Air Force, 3 February–June 1942
 333d Fighter Squadron, 18th Fighter Group, 23 August-10 September 1942
 333d Fighter Squadron, 318th Fighter Group, 28 July 1943 – 5 July 1944
 394th Bombardment Squadron (Heavy), 5th Bombardment Group (Heavy), 30 May-23 July 1942 and 28 September-17 November 1942
 531st Fighter Squadron, Seventh Air Force, March-20 April 1944

 Fort Kamehameha, Oahu, Hawaiian Islands
 
 Seventh Air Force
 Headquarters, VII Fighter Command, 18 January–March 1945

 Fort Shafter, Oahu, Hawaiian Islands
 
 Headquarters Hawaiian Air Force, Hawaiian Department, U.S. Army, 1 November 1940 – 4 February 1942
 Headquarters 7th Air Force, Hawaiian Department, U.S. Army, 5 February-17 September 1942
 Headquarters Seventh Air Force, Hawaiian Department, U.S. Army, 18 September 1942 – 15 August 1943; U.S. Army Forces in Central Pacific Area, c. 16 Aug 1943 – 31 July 1944; and Army Air Forces, Pacific Ocean Areas, 1 Aug 1944 – 18 December 1944
 Headquarters, VII Interceptor Command, 2 February-14 May 1942
 Headquarters, VII Fighter Command, 15 May 1942 – 19 October 1944
 Headquarters, 7th Fighter Wing, 21 April 1944 – 17 November 1946

 Haleiwa Field, Oahu, Hawaiian Islands
 
 45th Pursuit Squadron (Fighter), 15th Pursuit Group (Fighter), 21–26 December 1941
 47th Pursuit Squadron (Fighter), 15th Pursuit Group Fighter).  25 March-15 May 1942
 47th Fighter Squadron, 15th Fighter Group, 15 May 1942 – 29 July 1943
 72d Fighter Squadron, 15th Fighter Group, 23 April-7 June 1943
 78th Fighter Squadron, 15th Fighter Group, 31 July 1943 – 5 January 1944

 Hickam Field, Oahu, Hawaiian Islands
 
 Seventh Air Force
 Headquarters, Army Air Forces, Pacific Ocean Areas, 1 August 1944 – 31 January 1945
 Headquarters, Hawaiian Air Force, 1 November 1940 – 2 February 1942
 Headquarters, 7th Air Force, 3 February-17 September 1942
 Headquarters, Seventh Air Force, 18 September 1942 – 12 December 1944
 Headquarters, VII Bomber Command, 29 January 1942-November 1943
 Headquarters, VII Fighter Command, 20 October 1944 – 17 January 1945
 Headquarters, 18th Wing, 30 October 1937 – 18 October 1940
 Headquarters, 18th Bombardment Wing, 19 October 1940 – 29 January 1942
 5th Bombardment Group (Heavy), 1 January 1939 – 30 November 1942
 4th Reconnaissance Squadron (Heavy), 1 January 1939 – 21 April 1942
 23d Bombardment Squadron (Heavy), 1 January 1939 – 23 March 1942
 31st Bombardment Squadron (Heavy), 8 February 1938 – 22 May 1942
 72d Bombardment Squadron (Heavy), 4 January 1939 – 10 December 1941
 394th Bombardment Squadron (Heavy), 22 April-29 May 1942 and 24 July-27 September 1942
 11th Bombardment Group (Heavy), 1 February 1940 – 21 July 1942
 26th Bombardment Squadron (Heavy), 1 February 1940 – 19 December 1941
 42d Bombardment Squadron (Heavy), 1 February 1940 – 4 June 1942
 50th Reconnaissance Squadron (Heavy), 9 October 1939 – 21 April 1942
 98th Bombardment Squadron (Heavy), 16 December 1941 – 10 August 1942
 431st Bombardment Squadron (Heavy), 22 April-23 July 1942 and 8 April-10 November 1943
 30th Bombardment Group (Heavy), 20 October-11 November 1943
 41st Bombardment Group (Medium), 16 October-16 December 1943
 47th Bombardment Squadron (Medium), 26 October-21 December 1943
 48th Bombardment Squadron (Medium), 20 October-21 December 1943
 396th Bombardment Squadron (Medium), 20 October-23 December 1943
 820th Bombardment Squadron (Medium), 20 October-23 December 1943
 307th Bombardment Group (Heavy), 1 November 1942-February 1943
 318th Fighter Group, 15 October 1942 – 8 February 1943
 19th Transport Squadron, Hawaiian Air Force, 1 January 1941 – 2 February 1942
 19th Transport Squadron, 7th Air Force, 3 February-28 May 1942
 22d Bombardment Squadron (Heavy), 7th Bombardment Group (Heavy) (22 December 1941 – 18 January 1942) (air echelon only; ground echelon at Brisbane, Queensland, Australia)
 46th Pursuit Squadron (Fighter), 15th Pursuit Group (Fighter), 6 February-14 May 1942
 46th Fighter Squadron, 15th Fighter Group, 15–21 May 1942
 58th Bombardment Squadron (Light), Hawaiian Air Force, 30 April-10 December 1941
 548th Night Fighter Squadron, VII Fighter Command, 16 September-15 October 1944

 John Rogers Field, Oahu, Hawaiian Islands
 
 Seventh Air Force
 6th Night Fighter Squadron, 15th Fighter Group, 3 March-5 June 1944
 6th Night Fighter Squadron, VII Fighter Command, 5 June-27 October 1944
 19th Transport Squadron. 7th Air Force. 29 May-4 July 1942
 19th Troop Carrier Squadron. 7th Air Force. 5 July-17 September 1942
 19th Troop Carrier Squadron. Seventh Air Force. 19 September 1942 – 14 August 1944
 19th Troop Carrier Squadron. VI Air Service Area Command. 15 August 1944 – 14 December 1945
 22d Bombardment Squadron (Heavy), (18 December 1941 – 18 January 1942) (air echelon; ground echelon at Brisbane, Queensland, Australia)

 Kahuku Field, Oahu, Hawaiian Islands
 
 Seventh Air Force
 508th Fighter Group, 6 January-24 February 1945
 466th Fighter Squadron, 6 January-24 February 1945
 467th Fighter Squadron, 6 January-2 March 1945
 468th Fighter Squadron, 6 January-2 March 1945
 6th Fighter Squadron, 18th Fighter Group, 30 August-16 November 1942
 38th Bombardment Squadron (Heavy), 30th Bombardment Group (Heavy), 20 October-11 November 1943
 42d Bombardment Squadron (Heavy), 11th Bombardment Group (Heavy), 19 Mary-22 June 1944
 43d Reconnaissance Squadron (Long Range, Photographic), U.S. Army Strategic Air Forces, 15 July 1945-February 1946
 86th Combat Mapping Squadron, Seventh Air Force (air echelon), October–November 1944
 86th Combat Mapping Squadron, AAF, Pacific Ocean Areas, 24 November 1944 – 14 July 1945
 372d Bombardment Squadron (Heavy), 307th Bombardment Group (Heavy), 2 November 1942 – 12 June 1942 (operated from Midway, 22–24 December 1942; and Funafuti, 18–23 April 1943)

 Kipapa Field, Oahu, Hawaiian Islands
 
 Seventh Air Force
 6th Fighter Squadron, 18th Fighter Group, 17 November 1942 – 15 March 1943 (detachment operating from Guadalcanal 28 February-8 January 1943)
 6th Night Fighter Squadron, 15th Fighter Group, 16 March 1943 – 2 March 1944 (detachment operated from Guadalcanal 16 March-15 September 1943 and another from New Guinea 18 April-14 September 1943)
 6th Night Fighter Squadron, VII Fighter Command, 28 October 1944 – 10 January 1945 (detachment operated from Kipapa 11 January-12 May 1945)
 19th Fighter Squadron, 318th Fighter Group, 30 May-3 September 1943
 28th Photographic Reconnaissance Squadron, Seventh Air Force, 16 January-8 October 1944 (detachments at Kwajalein, 30 January-24 September 1944; and Saipan, 11 July-8 October 1944)
 31st Bombardment Squadron (Heavy), 5th Bombardment Group (Heavy), 23 May-8 September 1942
 370th Bombardment Squadron (Heavy, 307th Bombardment Group (Heavy), 2 November 1942 – 17 March 1943 (operated from Midway, 22–24 December 1942 and Espiritu Santo, 6 February-17 March 1943)
 392d Bombardment Squadron (Heavy), 30th Bombardment Group (Heavy), 18 March-22 May 1945
 548th Night Fighter Squadron, VII Fighter Command, 16 October 1944 – 27 February 1945
 549th Night Fighter Squadron, VII Fighter Command, 20 October 1944 – 19 February 1945

 Kualoa Field, Oahu, Hawaiian Islands
 
 Seventh Air Force
 19th Fighter Squadron, 18th Fighter Group, 22 May-19 October 1942
 19th Fighter Squadron, 318th Fighter Group, 26 December 1943 – 17 April 1944
 28th Photographic Reconnaissance Squadron, Seventh Air Force 9 October-12 December 1944 and VI Air Service Area Command, 13 December 1944 – 7 May 1945, 9 October 1944 – 7 May 1945 (detachments at Saipan, 9 October 1944-May 1945; and Okinawa, 23 April-8 May 1945)
 31st Bombardment Squadron (Heavy), 5th Bombardment Group (Heavy), 9 September-9 November 1942
 41st Photographic Reconnaissance Squadron, 7th Fighter Wing, 18 April-31 May 1945
 42d Bombardment Squadron (Heavy), 11th Bombardment Group (Heavy), 5 June-7 July 1942 and 8 April-8 November 1943
 531st Fighter Squadron, Seventh Air Force, 21 April-14 June 1944
 531st Fighter Squadron, 21st Fighter Group, 15 June 1944 – 7 October 1944

 Mokulkeia Field, Oahu, Hawaiian Islands
 
 Seventh Air Force
 508th Fighter Group, 25 February-15 September 1945
 466th Fighter Squadron, 25 February-15 September 1945
 467th Fighter Squadron, 3 March-15 September 1945
 468th Fighter Squadron, 3 March-20 September 1945
 23d Bombardment Squadron (Heavy), 5th Bombardment Group (Heavy), 24 March-3 November 1942
 27th Bombardment Squadron (Heavy), 30th Bombardment Group (Heavy), 20 October-9 November 1943
 42d Bombardment Squadron (Heavy), 11th Bombardment Group (Heavy), 8–21 July 1942, 9 January-18 March 1944 and 23 June-21 September 1944
 45th Pursuit Squadron, 15th Pursuit Group, 27 December 1941 – 14 May 1942
 45th Fighter Squadron, 15th Fighter Group, 15 May-19 October 1942 and 6 April-18 June 1944
 46th Fighter Squadron, 15th Fighter Group, 22 May-15 December 1942
 46th Fighter Squadron, 21st Fighter Group, 13 October 1944 – 25 March 1945
 47th Fighter Squadron, 15th Fighter Group, 8 November 1943 – 7 June 1944
 72d Fighter Squadron, 21st Fighter Group, 8 June 1944 – 25 March 1945
 73d Fighter Squadron, 318th Fighter Group, 5 May-7 November 1943 and 1 April-7 June 1944
 424th Bombardment Squadron (Heavy), 307th Bombardment Group (Heavy), 2 November 1942 – 17 March 1942 (operated from Midway, 22–24 December 1942; Funafuti, 20 January-1 February 1943; and Funafuti, 20 January-1 February 1943)
 531st Fighter Squadron, 21st Fighter Group, 8 October 1944 – 25 March 1945

 Naval Air Station Barbers Point, Oahu, Hawaiian Islands
 
 19th Fighter Squadron, 18th Fighter Group 9 February-15 March 1943
 19th Fighter Squadron, 318th Fighter Group 16 March-19 May 1943

 Naval Air Station Kaneohe Bay, Oahu, Hawaiian Islands
 
 44th Pursuit Squadron, 18th Pursuit Group, 27 December 1941 – 24 January 1942
 73d Fighter Squadron, 318th Fighter Group, 26 January-4 May 1943
 78th Pursuit Squadron (Interceptor), 18th Pursuit Group (Interceptor), 9 December 1941 – 14 May 1942
 78th Fighter Squadron, 18th Fighter Group, 15 May 1942 – 22 January 1943

 Schofield Barracks, Oahu, Hawaiian Islands
 
 Seventh Air Force
 163d Liaison Squadron, AAF, Pacific Ocean Areas, 20 January-6 April 1945

 Stanley Field, Oahu, Hawaiian Islands
 
 Seventh Air Force
 19th Fighter Squadron, 318th Fighter Group, 4 September-25 December 1943
 45th Fighter Squadron, 15th Fighter Group, 20 December 1942 – 13 August 1943
 78th Fighter Squadron, 15th Fighter Group, 6 January-31 March 1944

 Waiele Gulch Field, Oahu, Hawaiian Islands
 

 Wheeler Field, Oahu, Hawaiian Islands
 
 Seventh Air Force
 Headquarters, 14th Pursuit Wing, 1 November 1940 – 23 January 1942
 15th Pursuit Group (Fighter), 1 December 1940 – 14 May 1942
 45th Pursuit Squadron (Fighter), 1 December 1940 – 20 December 1941
 46th Pursuit Squadron (Fighter), 1 December 1940 – 5 February 1942
 72d Pursuit Squadron (Fighter), 5 October 1941 – 14 May 1942
 15th Fighter Group, 15 May 1942 – 2 June 1944
 46th Fighter Squadron, 17 February-14 June 1944
 72d Fighter Squadron, 15 May 1942-24 July 1943 and 21 October-17 December 1943
 18th Pursuit Group (Interceptor), 21 January 1927 – 14 May 1942
 6th Pursuit Squadron (Interceptor), 11 January 1927 – 14 May 1942
 19th Pursuit Squadron (Interceptor_, 11 January 1927 – 19 February 1942
 44th Pursuit Squadron (Interceptor), 12–26 December 1941 and 25 January-14 May 1945
 47th Pursuit Squadron (Interceptor), 1 December 1940 – 21 February 1942
 73d Pursuit Squadron (Interceptor), 5 October 1941 – 14 May 1942
 78th Pursuit Squadron (Interceptor), 1 February 1940 – 8 December 1941
 18th Fighter Group, 15 May 1942 – 10 March 1943
 6th Fighter Squadron, 15 May-29 August 1942
 44th Fighter Squadron, 15 May-22 June 1942
 73d Fighter Squadron, 15–21 May 1942
 21st Fighter Group, 21 April-12 October 1944
 46th Fighter Squadron, 15th Fighter Group, 15 June-12 October 1944
 30th Bombardment Group (Heavy), March-28 September 1945
 27th Bombardment Squadron (Heavy), 23 May-24 September 1945
 38th Bombardment Squadron (Heavy), 17 March-20 September 1945
 392d Bombardment Squadron (Heavy), 23 May-28 September 1945
 819th Bombardment Squadron (Heavy), 14 October 1944 – 4 January 1946
 41st Bombardment Group (Medium), 14 October 1944 – 6 June 1945
 47th Bombardment Squadron (Medium), 5 November 1944 – 6 June 1945
 48th Bombardment Squadron (Medium), 14 October 1944 – 20 May 1945
 396th Bombardment Squadron (Medium), 14 October 1944 – 6 June 1945
 820th Bombardment Squadron (Medium), 14 October 1944 – 20 May 1945
 26th Bombardment Squadron (Heavy), 11th Bombardment Group (Heavy), 20 December 1941-19 July 1942 and 11 May-10 November 1943
 58th Bombardment Squadron (Light), Hawaiian Air Force, 1 June-17 March 1941 and 19 December 1941 – 2 February 1942
 58th Bombardment Squadron (Light), 7th Air Force, 3 February-17 September 1942
 58th Bombardment Squadron (Dive), Seventh Air Force, 18 September 1942 – 18 June 1943
 86th Observation Squadron, Hawaiian Air Force, 1 February-14 March 1941
 86th Observation Squadron, 7th Air Force, 17 August-3 September 1942
 86th Observation Squadron, Seventh Air Force, 8 September 1942 – 30 May 1943
 86th Reconnaissance Squadron (Bomber), Seventh Air Force, 31 May-12 November 1943
 86th Combat Mapping Squadron, Seventh Air Force, 13 November 1943 – 28 June 1944
 86th Combat Mapping Squadron air echelon, Seventh Air Force, June–October 1944
 371st Bombardment Squadron (Heavy), 307th Bombardment Group (Heavy), 2 November 1942 – 12 June 1943 (operated from Midway, 21–24 December 1942 and 6–12 February 1943; Canton, 6–12 February 1943 and Funafuti, 18–23 April 1943)

JOHNSTON ATOLL
 Naval Air Station Johnston Island, Johnston Island
 

LINE ISLANDS
 Casady Field, Christmas Island
 
 Seventh Air Force
 12th Pursuit Squadron (Interceptor), 50th Pursuit Group (Interceptor) attached to VII Interceptor Command, 10 February-14 May 1942
 12th Fighter Squadron, 50th Fighter Group attached to VII Fighter Command, 15 May-17 August 1942
 12th Fighter Squadron, 15th Fighter Group, 18 August-18 November 1942

MARIANA ISLANDS

GUAM ISLAND
 Agana Airfield, Guam, Marianas Islands
 
 Seventh Air Force
 11th Bombardment Group (Heavy), 25 October 1944 – 1 July 1945
 26th Bombardment Squadron (Heavy), 21 October 1944 – 1 July 1945
 42d Bombardment Squadron (Heavy), 22 September 1944 – 1 July 1945
 98th Bombardment Squadron (Heavy), 21 October 1944 – 1 July 1945
 431st Bombardment Squadron (Heavy), 21 October 1944 – 1 July 1945
 21st Fighter Group, 17 April – 10 October 1946.

 Harmon Airfield, Guam, Marianas Islands
 
 Twentieth Air Force
 Headquarters, Twentieth Air Force, 16 July 1945 – 15 May 1949
 Headquarters, XXI Bomber Command, 4 December 1944 – 16 July 1945
 9th Bombardment Group, Very Heavy, 9 June 1947 – 20 October 1948

 North Field, Guam, Mariana Islands
 
 Twentieth Air Force
 Headquarters: 314th Bombardment Wing, Very Heavy, 16 January 1945 – 14 June 1946
 19th Bombardment Group, Very Heavy, 16 January 1945 – 4 July 1950
 28th Bombardment Squadron, Very Heavy, 16 January 1945 – 27 June 1950
 30th Bombardment Squadron, Very Heavy, 16 January 1945 – 27 June 1950
 93d Bombardment Squadron, Very Heavy, 16 January 1945 – 27 June 1950
 29th Bombardment Group, Very Heavy, 17 January 1945 – 19 May 1946
 6th Bombardment Squadron, Very Heavy, 17 January 1945 – 20 May 1946
 43d Bombardment Squadron, Very Heavy, 17 January 1945 – 20 May 1946
 52d Bombardment Squadron, Very Heavy, 17 January 1945 – 20 May 1946
 39th Bombardment Group, Very Heavy, 18 February–17 November 1945
 60th Bombardment Squadron, Very Heavy, 18 February-16 November 1945
 61st Bombardment Squadron, Very Heavy, 18 February-16 November 1945
 62d Bombardment Squadron, Very Heavy, 18 February-16 November 1945
 330th Bombardment Group, Very Heavy, 18 February–15 November 1945
 457th Bombardment Squadron, Very Heavy, 18 February-21 November 1945
 458th Bombardment Squadron, Very Heavy, 18 February-21 November 1945
 458th Bombardment Squadron, Very Heavy, 18 February-19 November 1945

 Northwest Field, Guam, Mariana Islands
 
 Eighth Air Force
 382d Bombardment Group, Very Heavy, 8 September–16 December 1945
 Note: Only ground echelons of the 420th, 464th and 872d Bombardment Squadrons, Very Heavy, arrived. The air echelons remained in the U.S. until inactivated.
 Twentieth Air Force
 Headquarters: 315th Bombardment Wing, Very Heavy, 5 April 1945 – 29 May 1946
 16th Bombardment Group, Very Heavy, 14 April 1945 – 15 April 1946
 15th Bombardment Squadron, Very Heavy, 14 April 1945 – 15 April 1946
 16th Bombardment Squadron, Very Heavy, 14 April 1945 – 15 April 1946
 17th Bombardment Squadron, Very Heavy, 14 April 1945 – 15 April 1946
 331st Bombardment Group, Very Heavy, 12 May 1945 – 15 April 1946
 355th Bombardment Squadron, Very Heavy, 12 May 1945 – 15 April 1946
 356th Bombardment Squadron, Very Heavy, 12 May 1945 – 15 April 1946
 357th Bombardment Squadron, Very Heavy, 12 May 1945 – 15 April 1946
 501st Bombardment Group, Very Heavy, 14 May 1945 – 10 June 1946
 21st Bombardment Squadron, Very Heavy, 14 May 1945 – 10 June 1946
 41st Bombardment Squadron, Very Heavy, 14 May 1945 – 10 June 1946
 485th Bombardment Squadron, Very Heavy, 14 May 1945 – 10 June 1946
 502d Bombardment Group, Very Heavy, 12 May 1945 – 15 April 1946
 402d Bombardment Squadron, Very Heavy, 12 May 1945 – 15 April 1946
 411th Bombardment Squadron, Very Heavy, 12 May 1945 – 15 April 1946
 430th Bombardment Squadron, Very Heavy, 12 May 1945 – 15 April 1946
 41st Photographic Reconnaissance Squadron, AAF Pacific Ocean Areas, 13 June–15 July 1945
 41st Photographic Reconnaissance Squadron, U.S. Army Forces, Middle Pacific (attached to Twentieth Air Force), 16 July-18 September 1945

 Orote Field, Guam, Mariana Islands
 

SAIPAN ISLAND

 East Field, Saipan, Mariana Islands
 
 Seventh Air Force
 Headquarters, Seventh Air Force, Army Air Forces, Pacific Ocean Areas, 13 December 1944 – 13 July 1945
 Headquarters, VII Bomber Command, August–July 1944
 21st Fighter Group, 4 December 1945 – 17 April 1946
 30th Bombardment Group (Heavy), 4 August 1944 – February 1945
 318th Fighter Group, June 1944 – 30 April 1945
 6th Night Fighter Squadron detachment, VII Fighter Command, 21 July 1944 – 1 May 1945
 9th Troop Carrier Squadron, Seventh Air Force, 4 August 1944 – July 1946
 28th Photographic Reconnaissance Squadron. Seventh Air Force, 11 July 1944 – May 1945
 86th Combat Mapping Squadron ground echelon, Seventh Air Force, 8 July-23 October 1944
 86th Combat Mapping Squadron ground echelon, AAF, Pacific Ocean Areas, 24 October-6 November 1944
 548th Night Fighter Squadron detachment, VII Fighter Command, 17 February - 6 March 1945
 549th Night Fighter Squadron air echelon, VII Fighter Command, 20 February – 20 March 1945

 Isley Field, Saipan, Mariana Islands
 
 Twentieth Air Force
 Headquarters, 73d Bombardment Wing, Very Heavy, 24 August 1944-19-October 1945
 497th Bombardment Group, Very Heavy, 17 September 1944 – 1 November 1945
 869th Bombardment Squadron, Very Heavy, 17 September 1944 – 1 November 1945
 870th Bombardment Squadron, Very Heavy, 17 September 1944 – 1 November 1945
 871st Bombardment Squadron, Very Heavy, 17 September 1944 – 1 November 1945
 498th Bombardment Group, Very Heavy, 6 September 1944 – 2 November 1945
 873d Bombardment Squadron, Very Heavy, 7 September 1944 – 2 November 1945
 874th Bombardment Squadron, Very Heavy, 7 September 1944 – 1 November 1945
 875th Bombardment Squadron, Very Heavy, 7 September 1944 – 2 November 1945
 499th Bombardment Group, Very Heavy, 18 September 1944 – 9 November 1945
 877th Bombardment Squadron, Very Heavy, 22 September 1944-November 1945
 878th Bombardment Squadron, Very Heavy, 22 September 1944-November 1945
 879th Bombardment Squadron, Very Heavy, 22 September 1944-November 1945
 500th Bombardment Group, Very Heavy, 18 September 1944 – 21 October 1945
 881st Bombardment Squadron, Very Heavy, 19 September 1944 – 15 November 1945
 882d Bombardment Squadron, Very Heavy, 19 September 1944 – 15 November 1945
 883d Bombardment Squadron, Very Heavy, 19 September 1944 – 15 November 1945

 Kobler Field, Saipan, Mariana Islands
 
 819th Bombardment Squadron

TINIAN ISLAND

 North Field, Tinian, Mariana Islands
 
 Twentieth Air Force
 Headquarters, 313th Bombardment Wing, Very Heavy, 24 December 1944 – 14 March 1946
 6th Bombardment Group, Very Heavy, 28 December 1944 – 27 January 1946
 24th Bombardment Squadron, Very Heavy, 28 December 1945 – 12 March 1946
 39th Bombardment Squadron, Very Heavy, 28 December 1945 – 12 March 1946
 40th Bombardment Squadron, Very Heavy, 28 December 1945 – 12 March 1946
 9th Bombardment Group, Very Heavy, 28 December 1944 – 14 April 1946
 1st Bombardment Squadron, Very Heavy, 28 December 1944 – 7 March 1946
 5th Bombardment Squadron, Very Heavy, 28 December 1944 – 6 March 1946
 99th Bombardment Squadron, Very Heavy, 28 December 1944 – 7 March 1946
 504th Bombardment Group, Very Heavy, 23 December 1944 – 5 March 1946
 398th Bombardment Squadron, Very Heavy, 23 December 1944 – 12 March 1946
 421st Bombardment Squadron, Very Heavy, 23 December 1944 – 12 March 1946
 680th Bombardment Squadron, Very Heavy, Second Air Force attached to 504th Bombardment Group, 15 June 1945 – 12 March 1946
 505th Bombardment Group, Very Heavy, 19 December 1944 – 5 March 1946
 482d Bombardment Squadron, Very Heavy, 24 December 1944 – 5 March 1946
 483d Bombardment Squadron, Very Heavy, 24 December 1944 – 5 March 1946
 484th Bombardment Squadron, Very Heavy, 24 December 1944 – 5 March 1946
 509th Composite Group, 29 May–17 October 1945
 320th Troop Carrier Squadron, 30 May-17 October 1945
 393d Bombardment Squadron, Very Heavy, 30 May-17 October 1945

 West Field, Tinian, Mariana Islands
 
 Twentieth Air Force
 Headquarters, 58th Bombardment Wing, (Very Heavy), 29 March–15 November 1945
 40th Bombardment Group, Very Heavy, 4 April–7 November 1945
 25th Bombardment Squadron, Very Heavy, April-7 November 1945
 44th Bombardment Squadron, Very Heavy, April-7 November 1945
 45th Bombardment Squadron, Very Heavy, April-7 November 1945
 444th Bombardment Group, Very Heavy, 7 April–18 September 1945
 676th Bombardment Squadron, Very Heavy, April-27 October 1945
 677th Bombardment Squadron, Very Heavy, April-27 October 1945
 678th Bombardment Squadron, Very Heavy, April-27 October 1945
 462d Bombardment Wing, Very Heavy, 4 April–5 November 1945
 768th Bombardment Squadron, Very Heavy, April-15 November 1945
 769th Bombardment Squadron, Very Heavy, April-15 November 1945
 770th Bombardment Squadron, Very Heavy, April-15 November 1945
 468th Bombardment Group, Very Heavy, 6 April–15 November 1945
 792d Bombardment Squadron, Very Heavy, 7 May-15 November 1945
 793d Bombardment Squadron, Very Heavy, 7 May-15 November 1945
 794th Bombardment Squadron, Very Heavy, 7 May-15 November 1945

MARSHALL ISLANDS

 Eniwetok Airfield (Stickell Field), Eniwetok Atoll, Marshall Islands
 
 Seventh Air Force
 86th Combat Mapping Squadron detachment, Seventh Air Force, June–August 1944

 Kwajalein Airfield, Kwajalein, Marshall Islands
 
 Seventh Air Force
 Headquarters, VII Bomber Command, March–August 1944
 11th Bombardment Group (Heavy), 5 April-24 October 1944
 26th Bombardment Squadron (Heavy), 14 April-20 October 1944
 98th Bombardment Squadron (Heavy), 3 April-20 October 1944
 431st Bombardment Squadron (Heavy), 31 March-20 October 1944
 30th Bombardment Group (Heavy), 20 March – 4 August 1944
 28th Photographic Reconnaissance Squadron detachments, Seventh Air Force, 30 June – 24 September 1944
 86th Combat Mapping Squadron detachment, Seventh Air Force, May–June 1944

MIDWAY ISLANDS

 Henderson Field, Midway Atoll, Hawaiian Islands
 
 Seventh Air Force
 18th Reconnaissance Squadron, 22nd Bombardment Group*, 3 June–6, 1942
 31st Bombardment Squadron (Heavy), 5th Bombardment Group (Heavy)*, 3–6 June 1942
 42d Bombardment Squadron, (Heavy) 11th Bombardment Group (Heavy)*, 3–6 June 1942
 69th Bombardment Squadron (Medium), 38th Bombardment Group (Medium)* 3–6 June 1942
 72d Bombardment Squadron (Heavy), 5th Bombardment Group (Heavy)*, 3–6 June 1942
 73d Fighter Squadron, 18th Fighter Group, 17 June 1942 – 26 January 1943
 78th Fighter Squadron, 18th Fighter Group 23 January-15 March 1943
 78th Fighter Squadron, 15th Fighter Group 16 March-22 April 1943
 431st Bombardment Squadron (Heavy), 11th Bombardment Group (Heavy)*, 29 May – 6 June 1942
.* Detachments deployed for use in Battle of Midway

PHOENIX ISLANDS

 Topham Field, Canton Island
 
 Seventh Air Force
 26th Bombardment Squadron (Heavy), 11th Bombardment Group (Heavy), (air echelon operated from Canton Island 12 November-31 December 1943)
 46th Fighter Squadron, 15th Fighter Group, 27 March-17 December 1943
 58th Bombardment Squadron (Dive), Seventh Air Force, 24 June-13 August 1943
 333d Fighter Squadron, 18th Fighter Group, 11 September 1942 – 10 January 1943
 333d Fighter Squadron, 318th Fighter Group, 11 January-5 April 1943
 392d Bombardment Squadron, Heavy, 30th Bombardment Group, Heavy 10 January-16 March 1944
 531st Fighter-Bomber Squadron, Seventh Air Force, 14 August-17 December 1943

RYUKYU ISLANDS

 Hamasaki, Okinawa Island, Ryukyu Islands
 Fifth Air Force
 Headquarters Fifth Air Force, 4 August-24 September 1945
 Headquarters V Bomber Command, August–October 1945
 Headquarters V Fighter Command, August–October 1945
 308th Bombardment Wing (Heavy), 16 June-27 September 1945

 Ie Shima Airstrip, Ie Shima Island, Ryukyu Islands
 
 Fifth Air Force
 3d Air Commando Group, August-26 October 1945
 3d Fighter Squadron (Commando), 9 August-26 October 1945
 4th Fighter Squadron (Commando), 9 August-26 October 1945
 160th Liaison Squadron (Commando), 15 August-21 September 1945 (attached to 5th Air Liaison Group (Provisional)
 318th Troop Carrier Squadron (Commando), 25 August-17 October 1945
 8th Fighter Group, 6 August-21 November 1945
 35th Fighter Squadron, 9 August-20 November 1945
 36th Fighter Squadron, 6 August-23 November 1945
 80th Fighter Squadron, 5 August-24 November 1945
 43d Bombardment Group, Heavy, 26 July-9 December 1945
 63d Bombardment Squadron, Heavy, 25 July-9 December 1945
 64th Bombardment Squadron, Heavy, 26 July-9 December 1945
 65th Bombardment Squadron, Heavy, 24 July-9 December 1945
 403d Bombardment Squadron, Heavy, 22 July-9 December 1945
 71st Reconnaissance Group, August-5 October 1945
 17th Reconnaissance Squadron(Bombardment), 29 July-25 October 1945 (detachment at Lingayen, Luzon, Philippine Islands to September 1945)
 82d Tactical Reconnaissance Squadron, 28 July-6 October 1945
 110th Tactical Reconnaissance Squadron, 28 July-5 October 1945
 90th Bombardment Group, Heavy, 10 August–December 1945
 319th Bombardment Squadron, Heavy, 12 August-22 November 1945
 320th Bombardment Squadron, Heavy, 10 August-22 November 1945
 321st Bombardment Squadron, Heavy, 15 August-22 November 1945
 400th Bombardment Squadron, Heavy, 11 August-22 November 1945
 345th Bombardment Group, Medium, 25 July-10 December 1945
 498th Bombardment Squadron, Medium, 20 July-1 December 1945
 499th Bombardment Squadron, Medium, 28 July-1 December 1945
 500th Bombardment Squadron, Medium, 27 July-1 December 1945
 501st Bombardment Squadron, Medium, 28 July-11 December 1945
 348th Fighter Group, 9 July–October 1945
 340th Fighter Squadron, 9 July-8 September 1945
 341st Fighter Squadron, 12 July-8 September 1945
 342d Fighter Squadron, 12 July-19 October 1945
 460th Fighter Squadron, 12 July-23 November 1945
 475th Fighter Group, 8 August-22 September 1945
 431st Fighter Squadron, 8 August-4 October 1945
 432d Fighter Squadron, 8 August-27 September 1945
 433d Fighter Squadron, 8 August-27 September 1945
 421st Night Fighter Squadron, V Fighter Command, 24 July-24 November 1945
 547th Night Fighter Squadron, V Fighter Command, 13 August -6 October 1945
 Seventh Air Force
 318th Fighter Group, 30 April-30 July 1945
 19th Fighter Squadron, 30 April-30 July 1945
 73d Fighter Squadron, 30 April-30 July 1945
 333d Fighter Squadron, 30 April-30 July 1945
 Eighth Air Force
 301st Fighter Wing, 15 August-28 November 1945
 318th Fighter Group, 15 August–November 1945
 19th Fighter Squadron, 15 August–November 1945
 73d Fighter Squadron, 15 August–November 1945
 333d Fighter Squadron, 15 August–November 1945
 413th Fighter Group, 15 August 1945 – 9 November 1945
 1st Fighter Squadron, 15 August-16 November 1945
 21st Fighter Squadron, 15 August-20 November 1945
 34th Fighter Squadron, 15 August-16 November 1945
 507th Fighter Group, 15 August 1945 – 28 January 1946
 463d Fighter Squadron, 15 August 1945 – 28 January 1946
 464th Fighter Squadron, 15 August 1945 – 28 January 1946
 465th Fighter Squadron, 15 August 1945 – 28 January 1946
 Twentieth Air Force
 301st Fighter Wing, 19 May-14 August 1945 (attached to Army Air Forces, Pacific Ocean Area, 21 May 1945 and Seventh Air Force, 1 June-14 August 1945)
 318th Fighter Group, 31 July 1945 – 14 August 1945
 19th Fighter Squadron, 31 July 1945 – 14 August 1945
 73d Fighter Squadron, 31 July 1945 – 14 August 1945
 333d Fighter Squadron, 31 July 1945 – 14 August 1945
 413th Fighter Group, 19 May-14 August 1945
 1st Fighter Squadron, 19 May-14 August 1945
 21st Fighter Squadron, 19 May-14 August 1945
 34th Fighter Squadron, 19 May-14 August 1945
 507th Fighter Group, 24 June-14 August 1945
 463d Fighter Squadron, 24 June-14 August 1945
 464th Fighter Squadron, 24 June-14 August 1945
 465th Fighter Squadron, 24 June-14 August 1945
 28th Photographic Reconnaissance Squadron, Seventh Air Force, (detachment operated from Ie Shima 14 May-21 June 1945)

 Kadena Field, Okinawa Island, Ryukyu Islands
 
 Fifth Air Force
 49th Fighter Group, 16 August-14 September 1945
 7th Fighter Squadron, 17 August-14 September 1945
 8th Fighter Squadron, 17 August-14 September 1945
 9th Fighter Squadron, 16 August-14 September 1945
 348th Fighter Group, 9 July–October 1945
 340th Fighter Squadron, 9 July-8 September 1945
 341st Fighter Squadron, 12 July-8 September 1945
 342d Fighter Squadron, 12 July-19 October 1945
 Headquarters, Eighth Air Force, U.S. Army Strategic Air Forces, 16 Jul 1945 – 7 June 1946

 Motobu Airfield, Okinawa Island, Ryukyu Islands
 
 Fifth Air Force
 58th Fighter Group, 10 July-25 October 1945
 69th Fighter Squadron, 8 July-25 October 1945
 310th Fighter Squadron, 9 July-25 October 1945
 311th Fighter Squadron, 8 July-25 October 1945

 Yontan Field, Okinawa Island, Ryukyu Islands
 
 Fifth Air Force
 35th Fighter Group, 28 June–October 1945
 39th Fighter Squadron, 30 June-10 October 1945
 40th Fighter Squadron, 30 June-9 October 1945
 41st Fighter Squadron, 30 June-9 October 1945
 Seventh Air Force
 Headquarters, Seventh Air Force, Far East Air Forces, 14 July-31 December 1945
 Headquarters, VII Bomber Command, Jul 1945-March 1946

VOLCANO ISLANDS

 North Field, Iwo Jima, Volcano Islands
 
 Known as Motoyama Number 3 by the Japanese. Construction began on North Field and it was designed to have a single runway 5,200-feet (1,280-meters) long for fighter aircraft. This field did not become operational before the end of the war.

 Central Field, Iwo Jima, Volcano Islands
 
 Known as Motoyama Number 2 by the Japanese. This field was to be developed for staging B-29 Superfortresses en route from the Mariana Islands to Japan and had two B-29 Superfortress runways, a 5,200-foot (1,585-meter) fighter runways and a combat service center. The first B-29 runway was 9,800-feet (2,987-meters) long and was completed by 12 July; the second B-29 runway had been graded to 9,400-feet (2,865-meters) by V-J Day but was never surfaced. The old Japanese east-west runway became a 6,000-foot (1,829-meter) fueling strip.
 Headquarters, VII Fighter Command, March-30 November 1945
 21st Fighter Group, 21 March–15 July 1945
 46th Fighter Squadron, 26 March-15 July 1945
 72d Fighter Squadron, 26 March-15 July 1945
 531st Fighter Squadron, 26 March-15 July 1945
 41st Photographic Reconnaissance Squadron detachment. U.S. Army Forces, Middle Pacific, 9 August – c. 15 September 1945
 548th Night Fighter Squadron, AAF Pacific Ocean Area, 5 March – 8 June 1945
 549th Night Fighter Squadron, VII Fighter Command, 14 March 1945 – 5 February 1946
 South Field, Iwo Jima, Volcano Islands (Japan)
 
 Known as Motoyama Number 1 by the Japanese, the Japanese had built two runways, 5,025-feet (1,532-meters) and 3,965-feet (1,209-meters) long respectively. The Americans rebuilt this field to accommodate fighters and medium and heavy bombers. It became operational for fighters on 6 March 1945. By July, both runways were paved to 6,000-feet (1,829-meters) and had 7,940-feet (2,420-meters) of taxiways and 258 hardstands.
 15th Fighter Group, VII Fighter Command, 6 March-15 July 1945; U.S. Army Strategic Air Forces, 16 July-4 August 1945; and VII Fighter Command, 5 August–25 November 1945
 45th Fighter Squadron, 4 March - 24 November 1945
 47th Fighter Squadron, 27 February-4 December 1945
 78th Fighter Squadron, 2 March-24 November 1945
 21st Fighter Group, 16 July – Dec 1945
 46th Fighter Squadron, 16 July – Dec 1945
 72d Fighter Squadron, 16 July – Dec 1945
 531st Fighter Squadron, 16 July – Dec 1945
1,

See also
 United States Army Air Forces in the Pacific War (1941–1945)
 USAAF in Australia
 USAAF in the South Pacific
 USAAF in the Southwest Pacific

References

 Maurer, Maurer (1983). Air Force Combat Units of World War II. Maxwell AFB, Alabama: Office of Air Force History. .
 

United States Army Air Forces
Pacific Ocean theatre of World War II